Comana is a commune in Giurgiu County, Muntenia, Romania. It is composed of five villages: Comana, Vlad Țepeș, Budeni, Falaștoaca and Grădiștea. The commune is approximately 32 kilometers (20 miles) south of Bucharest.

Comana Monastery is located in the commune, as is Comana Nature Park, the largest protected area in southern Romania.

On the night of 6 to 7 of May 1944 a British bomber crash-landed at Comana.  The aircrew were killed.

Natives
 Marian Munteanu
 Eugen Nicolăescu
 Gelu Naum had a retreat at Comana

References

Communes in Giurgiu County
Localities in Muntenia
Important Bird Areas of Romania